Mitsubishi Electric America Foundation (MEAF) was established in 1991 by Mitsubishi Electric Corporation of Japan and the Mitsubishi Electric US group companies, which manufacture, market and distribute a wide range of consumer, industrial, commercial and professional electronics products. Based in the Washington D.C. area, MEAF works to make societal changes by investing in innovative strategies to empower youth with disabilities to lead productive lives. The Foundation supports national grant programs and employee volunteer programs across the United States. Since its inception, the Foundation has contributed more than $9 million to organizations assisting young people with disabilities.

Mission & vision

The Mitsubishi Electric America Foundation is dedicated to the mission of helping youth with disabilities maximize their potential and participation in society and empower them to lead productive lives through increased employment.
To increase employment opportunities for people with disabilities, MEAF — along with Mitsubishi Electric US employee volunteers — supports innovative strategies to empower youth with disabilities to lead valuable and constructive lives. MEAF works to develop leadership and self-advocacy skills in young people with disabilities, so that they will be prepared to successfully transition to adulthood and inclusive employment.
Mitsubishi Electric America Foundation is supporting this mission by raising awareness to promote the full inclusion of people with disabilities into society and helping youth with disabilities prepare to enter the workforce so that these leaders of tomorrow can reach their full potential.

Continuing projects

Washington, DC-based American Association of People with Disabilities (AAPD) is using a three-year grant from MEAF for its Summer Internship Program. AAPD places college students with disabilities in summer internships on Capitol Hill.

MEAF is providing a three-year grant to support the Girl Scout Council of the Nation's Capital for its Include All Girls Initiative.  This initiative helps promote the full inclusion of girls with disabilities in Girl Scouting, and helps develop their leadership skills for the future.

MEAF is engaged in a three-year project between the Tarjan Center at UCLA and Students for the Advancement of Global Entrepreneurship (SAGE) to Include All Students in Entrepreneurial Leadership Programs.  This program provides opportunities for youth with disabilities to build their entrepreneurial acumen.

The American Association of People with Disabilities is currently using a two-year grant from MEAF to expand Disability Mentoring Day  into a Pipelines of Talent Project.

MEAF has provided two years of funding for the Autistic Self Advocacy Network to support its Autistic Campus Leadership Academy  for autistic college students. The students develop their self-advocacy skills, and then put those skills into action to create more inclusive college campuses.

In 2016 MEAF supported a new film project Intelligent Lives by Dan Habib with $200,000. The film is about people with intellectual disabilities and how they were separated, the dismantling of separation and about people with mental disabilities, who break new ground.

New grants in 2012-13

The US Business Leadership Network, which is working in partnership with the Employer Assistance & Resource Network (EARN), received a grant from MEAF to develop a two-year Career Link Mentoring Program. The program places college students and recent graduates with disabilities in a mentoring relationship with business professionals.

MEAF is providing a two-year grant to the US International Council on Disability to establish a Youth in Development Internship Program The program places college students with disabilities in summer internships with international affairs organizations.

The Cincinnati Children's Hospital Medical Center is using an MEAF grant to support the Project SEARCH Training Institute, which gathers and shares best practices related to placing students with severe disabilities in competitive jobs.

MEAF is providing a two-year grant to Wilderness Inquiry for Project WILD. The project provides adventure leadership training to high school students with intellectual disabilities to help them build their confidence and leadership skills.

Awards and recognition

Mitsubishi Electric America Foundation annually presents the M.O.V.E. Award to recognize outstanding volunteer efforts implemented by Mitsubishi Electric volunteers in the U.S. For its philanthropic and volunteer efforts to promote the full inclusion of young people with disabilities, Mitsubishi Electric America Foundation has received the following awards and recognition:

2010	Council on Foundations presented the Wilmer Shields Rich Award for Excellence in Communications Gold Award for Websites to the Mitsubishi Electric America Foundation

2009	Kids Included Together presented the KIT Founders Award to Rayna Aylward, Executive Director of the Mitsubishi Electric America Foundation

2008	The Girl Scout Council of the Nation's Capital presented the Officer's Award to the Mitsubishi Electric America Foundation

2006	Disability Funders Network presented The William Diaz Impact Award to the Mitsubishi Electric America Foundation

2005 	Association of Educational Publishers presented the Distinguished Achievement Award for Best Science Website to the National Wildlife Federation for Happenin' Habitats, a Mitsubishi Electric America Foundation funded program
 
2000	American Foundation for the Blind presented the Helen Keller Achievement Award to Kiyoshi Kawakami, president & CEO, Mitsubishi Electric US, Inc. and president, Mitsubishi Electric America Foundation

1992 	The Dole Foundation for Employment of Persons with Disabilities presented the Leadership Award to Mitsubishi Electric America Foundation

References

External links
 Mitsubishi Electric America Foundation
 Mitsubishi Electric
 Mitsubishi Electric US
 Wilderness Inquiry

Foundations based in Washington, D.C.
Mitsubishi Electric